Urbanized areas in the United States are defined by the U.S. Census Bureau as contiguous census block groups with a population density of at least 1,000 per square mile (about 400 per square km). Urban areas are delineated without regard to political boundaries. Urban areas with a population of at least 50,000 serve as the core of a metropolitan statistical area.

Areas over 100,000
The following is a list of urbanized areas in the American Midwest with a population of at least 100,000. States within the Midwest are Illinois, Indiana, Iowa, Kansas, Michigan, Minnesota, Missouri, Nebraska, North Dakota, Ohio, South Dakota and Wisconsin.  Areas are ranked based on population as listed in the 2010 U.S. Census.

Areas under 100,000

The following are areas which in the 2010 U.S. Census Bureau had a population under 100,000, and over 50,000.  Areas are ranked based on population as listed in the 2010 U.S. Census.

See also
 List of United States urban areas
 List of Midwestern metropolitan areas
 List of Midwestern cities by size

References

Midwestern Urban Areas
Midwestern United States